Monti Fest is a major Catholic festival held on 8 September every year by the Latin Catholic community of Konkani people, originating in the Konkan region of India, and their descendants in the Canara region of south India. This festival celebrates the Nativity of the Blessed Virgin Mary and in the Mangalorean Catholic community involves blessing of Novem (new crops). In certain Goan Catholic dialects the festival's name is corrupted to "Moti Fest".

According to the Konkani scholar, Pratap Naik, the festival derives its name from the Capela de Nossa Senhora do Monte (Portuguese for "Chapel of Our Lady of the Mount") in Old Goa. The chapel was constructed in 1519 on a hillock commanding a view of the Mandovi River on the orders of Afonso de Albuquerque in honour of Our Lady. The feast day on 8 September, called Monti Saibinichem Fest (Konkani for "Feast of the Lady of the Mount"), instituted in the sixteenth century and continues to this day. Since, flowers and garlands are an integral part of the celebration, the Konkani epithet Fulanchem Fest (Feast of flowers). The Bandra Fest celebrated by the Bombay East Indian community, is a similar grand affair celebrated annually and coincides with Monti Fest.

Naik observes the following:  According to the Hindu calendar after Shravan month, Bhadrapad month commences. On the fourth day of this month comes Ganesh Chaturthi. For this feast all members of the Konkani Hindu family gather and celebrate from one-and-half to ten days. During this festive period Ganpati's idol is installed in the house and flowers are offered to it daily. On one day during this festive period new corn is ceremoniously partaken. The Christianisation of Goa led to the mass conversion of Hindus from Ilhas de Goa (Tiswadi) and Jesuits taught the new converts to give votive offerings of flowers to honour of Monti Saibinn (Lady of the Mount) instead. Thus, the Nativity feast which is celebrated by most Christians all over the world on 8 September, came to be called Monti Saibinichem Fest (Lady of the Mount Feast) for Konkani speaking Christians. Shaivite Konkani-speaking converts of those days celebrated the festival associated with Gowri Habba and Ganesh Chaturthi. Thanks to the initiative taken by Joachim Miranda, Monti Fest celebrations were renewed at Monte Mariano Church, Farangipet, Mangalore in 1799, after a 15-year-long intermission due to the Captivity of Mangalorean Catholics at Seringapatam which ended with the Siege of Seringapatam (1799). Miranda was a Goan posted in Mangalore at the time, and would have been familiar with the festal celebration in Goa. Thus, Goa is said to be the original host of Monti Fest. Though Tippu Sultan destroyed the churches, seminaries and convents of Canara, he spared the Monte Mariano Church at Farangipet in deference to the friendship of his father Hyder Ali with Miranda.

Notes

Patronal festivals in India
 
September observances
Marian feast days